= Soda Spring Valley =

Coordinates: 38°26′35″N 118°06′36″W

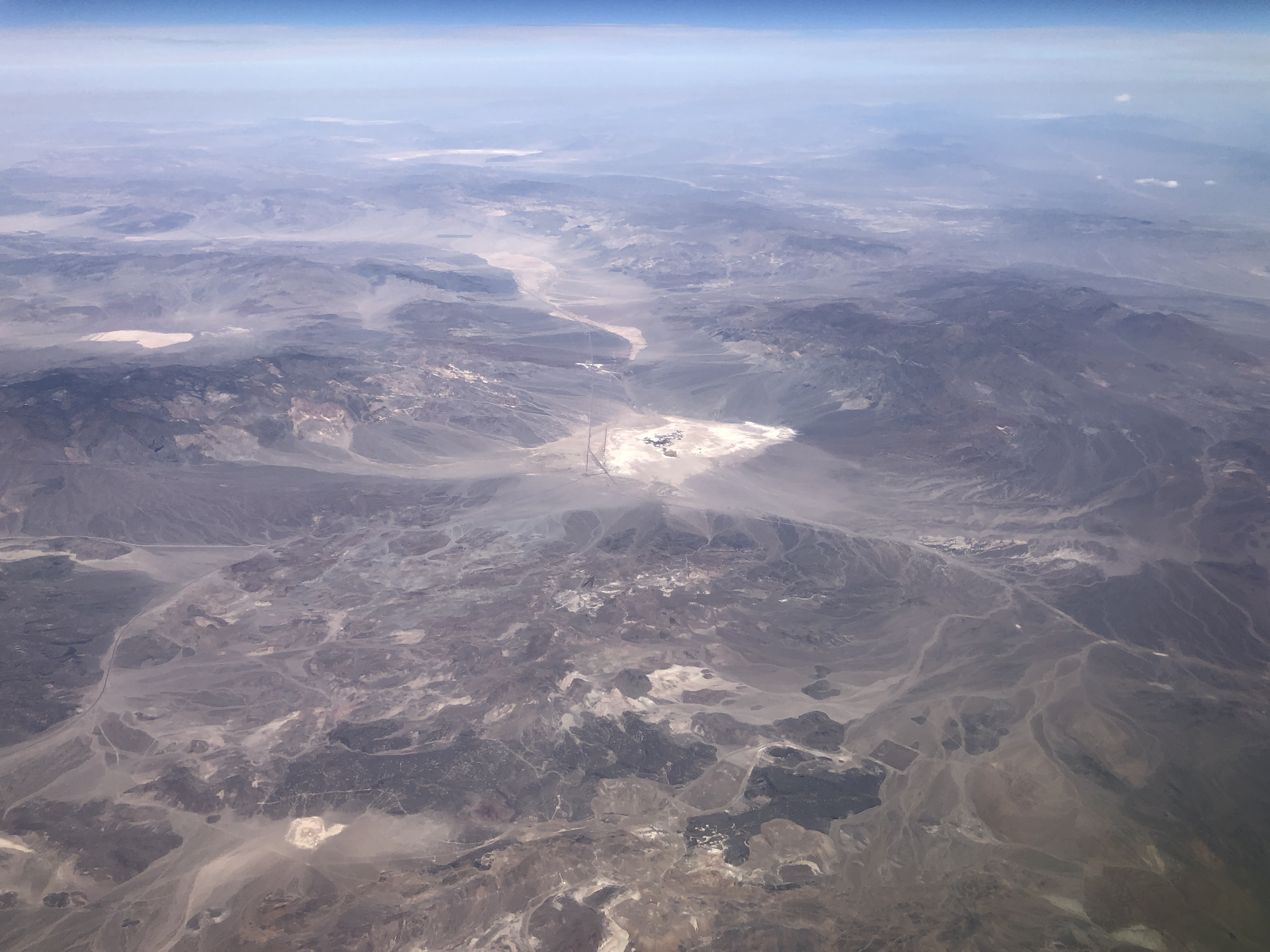
View of Soda Spring Valley (upper center) from an airplane

Soda Spring Valley is a valley in the U.S. state of Nevada.

Soda Spring Valley is named for the mineral springs within the valley.
